(alternatively Kikaiga-shima, Kikai Caldera Complex) is a massive, mostly submerged caldera up to  in diameter in the Ōsumi Islands of Kagoshima Prefecture, Japan.

Geology
Caldera formation has been dated from about 95,000 years ago and has involved rhyolite, basalt, and andesite phases. Yahazu-dake (north west part of Satsuma Io-jima) and Takeshima, located on the caldera rim, are pre-caldera volcanoes.

Kikai-Tozurahara eruption
This was about 95,000 years before the present and erupted Kikai-Tozurahara (K-Tz) tephra. Various dating techniques give ages between 70,000 to 100,000 years before present. This was distributed all over Japan but did not reach South Korea.

Akahoya eruption

The caldera was the source of the Akahoya eruption, one of the largest eruptions during the Holocene (10,000 years ago to present) that produced the Kikai-Akahoya (K-Ah) tephra. The eruption produced about 150 km³ of tephra, giving it a Volcanic Explosivity Index of 7 and making it one of the most explosive in the last 10,000 years, ranking alongside the eruptions of Santorini, Paektu, Crater Lake, Kurile Lake, Samalas and Tambora. According to ice cores, initially it was thought that the Akahoya eruption may have occurred in 4350 BC, however this timing has later been adjusted to about 1000 years earlier.

The eruption had a major impact on the Jōmon culture in southern Kyūshū although the impact was not as great as some commentary had suggested with Nishinozono sub-type pottery tradition, that had started prior to the eruption, maintained in Kyūshū.

Eruptive history since Akahoya eruption
Kikai is still an active volcano. Io-dake(Mount Iō), Inamura-dake (south coast of Satsuma-Io-jima), Tokara-Iwo-Jima (north east coast of Satsuma-Io-jima) and Shōwa Iōjima (Shin-Io-jima) are post-caldera volcanoes within it.  Minor eruptions occur frequently on Mount Iō, one of the post-caldera subaerial volcanic peaks on Iōjima. Iōjima is one of three volcanic islands, two of which lie on the caldera rim.  On June 4, 2013, weak tremors were recorded.  Shortly after, eruptions began and continued off-and-on for several hours.

Eruptions occurred: 
old Iwo-dake stage (stage OIo-I-II)
phreatomagmatic eruptions and pumice fallout (stage OIo-I), followed by rhyolitic lava with continuous tephra, resulting in a volcanic edifice (stage OIo-II)
3250 BCE ± 75 years (uncalibrated) Old Iwo-dake
OIo1a,b tephras
2450 BCE ± 840 years (tephrochronology) Old Iwo-dake
OIo2a,b tephras
 Inamura-dake stage (stage In-I-IV)
basaltic lava flows and scoria-cone building (stage In-I-II), then phreatomagmatic eruptions (stage In-III), and then andesitic lava (stage In-IV)
1830 BCE ± 75 years (uncalibrated) Inamura-dake
In-I tephra
1090 BCE ± 100 years (uncalibrated) Inamura-dake
young Iwo-dake stage (stage YIo-I-IV)
continuing with a different magma source including rhyolitic lava and intermittent pumice
280 BCE ± 75 years (uncalibrated) Iwo-dake
390 ± 100 years (uncalibrated) Iwo-dake
750 (tephrochronology) Iwo-dake
830 ± 40 years (uncalibrated) Iwo-dake
K-Iw-P1 tephra
1010 ± 40 years (uncalibrated) Iwo-dake
 K-Sk-u-3 tephra
1030 ± 40 years (uncalibrated) Iwo-dake
K-Sk-u-4 tephra
1340 ± 30 years (uncalibrated) Iwo-dake
K-Iw-P2 tephra
1430 ± 75 years (uncalibrated) Iwo-dake
 13 Feb 1914 Tokara-Iwo-Jima
Sep-Nov 1934
Submarine eruption with pumice
7 Dec 1934 -Mar 1935 2 km east of Tokara-Iwo-Jima
New island Shōwa Iōjima (Shin-Io-jima) with lava finally stabilised 19 January 1935
1997-2003 Iwo-dake
Formation and enlargement of new pit crater inside the summit crater
Apr-Nov 1998 Iwo-dake
Ash
May-Aug 1999 Iwo-dake
Ash
Jan, Mar, Oct-Dec 2000 Iwo-dake
Ash 
Feb, Apr-Dec 2001 Iwo-dake
Ash
May-Jul 2002 Iwo-dake
Ash
Feb, Apr-Oct 2003 Iwo-dake
Ash 
May-Apr, Jun, Aug-Oct 2004 Iwo-dake
Ash
3-5 May, 3-5 Jun 2013 Iwo-dake
Minor eruptions
2 Nov 2019 Iwo-dake
Minor eruption
29 Apr 2020 Iwo-dake
Minor eruption
6 Oct 2020 Iwo-dake
Minor eruption

See also
List of volcanoes in Japan

Further reading
 but also for more recent corrections to this

References

VolcanoWorld – Kikai, Kyūshū, Japan
鬼界カルデラ Kikai Caldera 独立行政法人 産業技術総合研究所 地 質 調 査 総 合 セ ン タ ー 
Kikai Caldera – Volcano Photos

External links 
 Satsuma-iojima - Geological Survey of Japan
 Kikai - Geological Survey of Japan
 Geology and eruptive history of Kikai Caldera - Earthquake Research Institute,The University of Tokyo
 Global Volcanism Program- Smithsonian Institution

Ōsumi Islands
VEI-7 volcanoes
Calderas of Japan
Active volcanoes
Submarine calderas
Volcanoes of Kagoshima Prefecture
Supervolcanoes
Holocene calderas